Phyllostegia mannii is a rare species of flowering plant in the mint family known by the common name Mann's phyllostegia. It is endemic to Hawaii, where it has been known from Maui and Molokai. It has not been observed on Maui since the early 20th century, or on Molokai since 1993, but it probably still exists in unsurveyed areas. It is a federally listed endangered species of the United States.

References

External links
USDA Plants Profile

mannii
Endemic flora of Hawaii
Biota of Maui
Biota of Molokai